was the thirteenth single by the Japanese band The Blue Hearts and reached #14 on the Oricon charts in 1992. When it was rereleased on February 6, 2002, it again placed on the Oricon charts, peaking at #11.

Details
Neither B-side's, "Minagoroshi no Melody" (皆殺しのメロディー Massacre Melody) nor "Tokyo Zombie (Russian Roulette)" (東京ゾンビ（ロシアンルーレット）), were included on the Stick Out album with "Yume"; they had already been recorded on the previous album High Kicks.

Though "Yume" was recorded in a studio, the B-side tracks were recorded on June 2, 1992, as the opening songs for the final performance of the band's High Kick Tour. However, studio recordings were used for the High Kicks album.

References

The Blue Hearts songs
1992 singles
Songs written by Masatoshi Mashima
1992 songs
East West Records singles